Franca is a municipality in the state of São Paulo, Brazil. The city is located in the northeastern portion of the state, distant 401 km (249 mi) from the state capital (São Paulo), and 676 km (420 mi) from Brasilia. It covers a total area of 605,679 km² of which 86,92 km² comprises the urban area. As of the 2021 Census, the city's population was 358,539. 

In Brazil, the city is known as ''The National Capital of Footwear'', and ''The National Capital of Basketball''.

The city is the industrial and economic center of an urban agglomerate comprising 19 municipalities with a total of 672.053 inhabitants, being consecutively among the top brazilian cities with the best urban sanitation. 

The parish of Franca was founded in 1805, being part of Mogi Mirim until 1824. The city status was received in 1856.

History

The history of Franca begins with the bandeiras of Bartolomeu Bueno da Silva (The Anhanguera) in the 18th century. 

During the opening of the route known as "Caminho de Goiás" (route to Goiás), new settlements were established along the route to serve as resting / stopping points for the entourages travelling along the way from São Paulo to Goiás, in search of gold. 

The settlement where the city is now located was formerly known as Pouso dos Bagres (stop of the catfishes).

In 1819, Franca was visited by French naturalist Auguste de Saint-Hilaire who dedicated the following message:

"The village of Franca, where I landed, is pleasantly in the midst of vast pastures, in an uncovered region, sown by bushes and cut by deep valleys. This charming village occupies the center of a path of land, wide and rounded, on each side. bathed by a small stream. At the time of my voyage, there were only about fifty houses there, but the sites for the construction of a large number of them were already marked, and it was easy to see that Franca would not take long to acquire greatness.

The parish of Franca was founded on December 03, 1805, being part of the territory of Vila de Mogi Mirim until 1824, when it was  emancipated by João VI and named Vila Franca do Imperador in honor of the Emperor Pedro I of Brazil. It received the status of city on April 24, 1856.

Around 1890, Franca was served by the Estrada de Ferro Mogiana, however, the railroad branch was deactivated after the construction of a new branch connecting Ribeirão Preto to Uberaba.

Due to the expansion of coffee production between the XIX and XX centuries, many italian immigrants settled in Franca, and the first shoe factory emerged in the late 1920s.

Franca took part in the Constitutionalist Revolution of 1932, losing six residents who fought to death for São Paulo.

Economy 
Franca is the largest footwear producer in Brazil and Latin America, housing thousands of medium and large industries, including the production of footwear components. The city houses reputed design centers intended for training new professionals to work in Brazil and abroad.

Franca is also traditionally connected to agriculture. It is located in the area of Alta Mogiana, one of the best coffee producing territories in the world, due to the abundance of purple soil, and favorable climate for cultivation.

The city houses a diversified industrial park, the production of metal, furniture, food, and beverage is very active. The industry of jewelry and diamond has been active for many years in Franca, placing the city as one of the largest diamond cutting centers in Brazil.

Transportation

Air 
The city is served by Ten. Lund Presotto Airport.

Roads 
 SP-334 – Candido Portinari (Franca to Ribeirão Preto)
 SP-345 – Engenheiro Ronan Rocha (Franca to Minas Gerais)
 SP-345 – Prefeito Fábio Talarico (Franca to Barretos)

Minor highways 
 Felipe Calixto (north quarter to Ribeirão Corrente)
 Rio Negro e Solimões (south quarter to Batatais)
 João Traficante (east quarter to Ibiraci)
 Tancredo Neves (east quarter to Claraval)
 Engenho Queimado (west quarter to Ribeirão Corrente)
 Nestor Ferreira (west quarter to Restinga)

Geography

Franca is located in the northeastern region of the state of São Paulo, the fifth highest municipality in the state with an altitude of 1,040 m above the sea level. The territory of Franca is covered by sandy soils dominated by the sandstones of Bauru, and Botucatu. Vegetation is dominated by grasses, and the forests are restricted to mountainous slopes. 

The basin of Rio Canoas (Canoas River) provide water for the city and the surrounding area.

The municipality of Franca borders Batatais, Cristais Paulista, Patrocínio Paulista, Ibiraci and Claraval.

Hydrography 
Here is a list of waterways located in the municipality of Franca:
 Rio das Canoas (en: Canoas River)
 Rio Pouso Alegre (en: Pouso Alegre River)
 Rio São João (en: São João / Saint John River)
 Ribeirão Salgado (en: Salgado Brook)

Climate

Franca has a tropical savanna climate (Aw), milder due to the elevation, with dry winters, rainy summers and moderate temperatures throughout the year. Occurrence of rain is high and it is one of the rainiest cities in the State of São Paulo.

The lowest recorded temperature was 0 °C on July 5, 1953, and the highest temperature was 37.8 °C on October 15, 2014.

The highest recorded rainfall reached 146 millimeters on March 28, 1931, and recently, 133.7 millimeters was recorded on November 21, 2018.

Demographics
2011: IBGE, Ipeadata Brazil:
Total population: 321.012 inhabitants (2011 Census).
 Urban: 315.355
 Rural: 5.657
Demographic density (inhabitants/km2): 526,09
Child mortality until 1 year (in 1000): 12,66 = 1,26%
Life expectancy (years): 73,03
Fertility (children per women): 2,26
Literacy: 96,37%
HDI : 0,820
 HDI-M Income: 0,755
 HDI-M Longevity: 0,800
 HDI-M Education: 0,906

Notable people
 Regina Duarte – Brazilian television actress.
 Abdias do Nascimento – scholar, artist, and politician.
 João do Amaral Gurgel – Brazilian businessman.
 Jaime Luiz Coelho – Archbishop.
 Dr. Ubiali – Brazilian doctor and congressman.
 Marquinhos – Brazilian footballer.

References

External links

Reviewed Franca
Franca View – Guide digital of Franca
Municipal Government website
EncontraFranca – Find everything about Franca city

 
Municipalities in São Paulo (state)
Populated places established in 1805
1805 establishments in Brazil